This is a list of diplomatic missions of Tanzania, excluding honorary consulates.

Africa

Americas

Asia

Europe

Multilateral organizations

Gallery

See also
 Foreign relations of Tanzania
 List of diplomatic missions in Tanzania
 List of heads of missions of Tanzania
 Visa policy of Tanzania

References

 
Diplomatic missions
Tanzania